Mystery Creek Events Centre is one of New Zealand's biggest events centres.
Located in the outskirts of Hamilton, New Zealand, it is home to many events, the largest being the National Agricultural Fieldays which is held annually in June.

Mystery Creek Events Centre boasts 114 hectares of land and event versatility with multi-functional facilities and an abundance of indoor and outdoor space ensuring the centre can host all components of an event on one property.

From 2004 - 2014 Mystery Creek hosted the annual Parachute Christian Music Festival and from 2015 has hosted the replacement event Festival One.

It also hosts Equidays, THE Expo, the New Zealand Motorhome, Caravan & Leisure Show, the BYM Baptist Ministries Easter Camp and many more popular events.
The events centre has hosted many sports including; international netball, Davis Cup tennis matches, Rally New Zealand and boxing.

Mystery Creek has been the venue for previous New Zealand Scout Jamborees and was the site of the 19th New Zealand Jamboree 2010/2011.
It is also the venue for the upcoming new Zealand Scout Jamboree (28 December 2019 - 7 January 2020).

References

External links
Official website
Fieldays website
Equidays website
1936 photo of Bledisloe Hall interior

Convention centres in New Zealand
Buildings and structures in Hamilton, New Zealand
Tourist attractions in Hamilton, New Zealand
Basketball venues in New Zealand
Defunct National Basketball League (Australia) venues
Netball venues in New Zealand
Sports venues in Hamilton, New Zealand
Boxing venues in New Zealand